Luis Alfredo López (born 11 September 1998) is a Nicaraguan footballer who plays as a left back for Liga Primera club Real Estelí FC and the Nicaragua national team.

References

1998 births
Living people
Sportspeople from Managua
Nicaraguan men's footballers
Association football fullbacks
Real Estelí F.C. players
Juventus Managua players
Nicaraguan Primera División players
Nicaragua international footballers